Indian Paint is a 1965 American Western film directed by Norman Foster and starring Johnny Crawford, Jay Silverheels and Pat Hogan.

Plot

Set before the arrival of Europeans in North America, the story centers on Nishko, a chief's son in the Great Plains.  During his rite of passage, Nishko is determined to tame a painted pony as an indication of his emerging manhood.

Cast
 Johnny Crawford as Nishko 
 Jay Silverheels as Chief Hevatanu 
 Robert L. Crawford Jr. as Wacopi
 Pat Hogan as Sutamakis 
 George J. Lewis as Nopawallo
 Joan Hallmark as Amatula 
 Cinda Siler as Petala 
 Bill Blackwell as Sutako 
 Al Doney as Latoso 
 Marshall Jones as Comanche leader 
 Suzanne Goodman as Widow of Latoso 
 Warren L. Dodge as Second Comanche

References

Bibliography
 Angela Aleiss. Making the White Man's Indian: Native Americans and Hollywood Movies. Greenwood Publishing Group, 2005.

External links
 

1965 films
1965 Western (genre) films
1960s English-language films
American Western (genre) films
American black-and-white films
Films directed by Norman Foster
Crown International Pictures films
1960s American films